"Yo Contigo, Tú Conmigo (The Gong Gong Song)" ("me with you, you with me") is a single by Colombian band Morat and the Spanish-German singer-songwriter Álvaro Soler. The single was produced as the theme song for the film Despicable Me 3, and was released on June 16, 2017. It won the "Song of the Year" award at the LOS40 Music Awards 2017.

Charts

Year-end charts

Certifications

References 

Film theme songs
2017 singles
Despicable Me
Songs about musical instruments
Universal Music Group singles